Wli Waterfalls is the highest waterfall in Ghana and the tallest in West Africa. It has a lower and an upper fall.

Location 
Wli Waterfalls is located 20 km from Hohoe in the Volta Region of Ghana.

Natural environment

Wildlife
A walk through the forest of the Agumatsa wildlife sanctuary offers a chance to see a large colony of fruit bats, butterflies, birds, monkeys and baboons.

Bats
A large colony of bats can be seen clinging to the cliffs and flying in the sky.

History 
The Wli waterfalls is the highest water fall in West Africa located in Ghana The falls is known locally as Agoomatsa waterfalls - meaning, "Allow Me to Flow." It is located in the Hohoe municipality of the Volta Region, the land of the Ewe culture. It is  approximately 280 kilometers from the capital Accra.

Gallery

References 

Waterfalls of Ghana